The 1979 Rudé Právo Cup was the third edition of the Rudé Právo Cup ice hockey tournament. Five teams participated in the tournament, which was won by the Soviet Union.

Tournament

Results

Final standings

References

External links
Tournament on hockeyarchives.ru

1979
1979–80 in Soviet ice hockey
1979–80 in Czechoslovak ice hockey
1979–80 in Swedish ice hockey
1979–80 in Canadian ice hockey
1979–80 in Finnish ice hockey
1979